Intel P3 may refer to:

 Intel Pentium III, a 6th generation Intel CPU design
 Intel 80386, a 3rd generation Intel processor design

πP3